Hadriania is a genus of sea snails, marine gastropod mollusks in the family Muricidae, the murex snails or rock snails.

Species
Species within the genus Hadriania include:
 † Hadriania brevituba (Millet, 1865) 
 Hadriania craticulata Bucquoy & Dautzenberg, 1882
 † Hadriania minutisquama Cossman & Peyrot, 1924
 † Hadriania mioincrassata Sacco, 1904
 Hadriania sperata (Cossmann, 1921)
 †  Hadriania textiliosa (Lamarck, 1803)
 Species brought into synonymy  
 Hadriania brocchii(Monterosato, 1872): synonym of Hadriania craticulata Bucquoy, Dautzenberg & Dollfus, 1882 (preoccupied species name)
 Hadriania craticuloides (Vokes, 1964):  synonym of Hadriania craticulata Bucquoy, Dautzenberg & Dollfus, 1882
 Hadriania oretea (de Gregorio, 1885): synonym of Hadriania craticulata Bucquoy, Dautzenberg & Dollfus, 1882
 Hadriania provencalis (Risso, 1826): synonym of Hadriania craticulata Bucquoy & Dautzenberg, 1882

References

 Cossmann (M.) & Peyrot (A.), 1924 Conchologie néogènique de l'Aquitaine. Actes de la Société Linnéenne de Bordeaux, t. 75, vol. 3, p. 193-318
 Cossmann (M.) & Peyrot (A.), 1924 Conchologie néogènique de l'Aquitaine. Extraits des Actes de la Société Linnéenne de Bordeaux, t. 4, vol. 2, p. 323-610

External links
 Bucquoy E., Dautzenberg P. & Dollfus G. (1882-1886). Les mollusques marins du Roussillon. Tome Ier. Gastropodes. Paris: Baillière & fils. 570 pp., 66 pls
 Barco A., Herbert G., Houart R., Fassio G. & Oliverio M. (2017). A molecular phylogenetic framework for the subfamily Ocenebrinae (Gastropoda, Muricidae). Zoologica Scripta. 46: 322-335

Ocenebrinae
Gastropod genera